Thomas P. McKenna (born July 23, 1930) is a retired United States Army officer and author. His book Kontum: The Battle to Save South Vietnam won the 2013 William E. Colby Award.

Early life
McKenna was born on July 23, 1930, and raised Nebraska and Florida. He was a Boy Scout and made Eagle rank.

Military career
Upon his graduation from Castle Heights Military Academy in 1948, McKenna enlisted in the army, and served with the 82nd Airborne Division. After a year of service, he was sent to West Point Military Academy. McKenna spent a total of 22 years in the military.

His military education included stints at the Parachute and Glider School, Basic and Advanced Infantry Officer Courses, Ranger School, Airborne School, Pathfinder School, and the Command and General Staff College. McKenna also obtained a master's degree in history from the University of Kansas.

He was stationed in Germany, Italy, Korea, and Vietnam, spending the last of his military career as an advisor to South Vietnam.  It was during his time as an advisor to South Vietnamese that the Battle of Kontum occurred.

References

1930 births
Living people
United States Army officers
United States Military Academy alumni
United States Army Command and General Staff College alumni
University of Kansas alumni
United States Army personnel of the Vietnam War
Writers from Vermont
21st-century American non-fiction writers
People from Lamoille County, Vermont
American military writers